Erich Kempka (16 September 1910 – 24 January 1975) was a member of the SS in Nazi Germany who served as Adolf Hitler's primary chauffeur from 1936 to April 1945. He was present in the area of the Reich Chancellery on 30 April 1945, when Hitler shot himself in the Führerbunker. Kempka delivered the petrol to the garden behind the Reich Chancellery, where the remains of Hitler and Eva Braun were burned.

Early life
Kempka was born on 16 September 1910 in Oberhausen to a miner with ten children. Kempka's paternal grandparents were Ruhr Poles. He worked as a mechanic for the automotive manufacturer DKW.

SS career

Kempka joined the Nazi Party on 1 April 1930 as member #225,639. Kempka served as chauffeur for Josef Terboven until 29 February 1932, when, based on Terboven's recommendation, he was tasked as a reserve driver for Adolf Hitler's personal entourage.

He became one of the original members of an eight-man squad known as the SS-Begleitkommando des Führers (SS Escort Command of the Führer), which later was known as the Führerbegleitkommando (FBK). The unit was assigned with protecting the life of Hitler. In 1934, he was present at the arrest of Ernst Röhm. In 1936, with the death of Julius Schreck, Kempka became Hitler's primary chauffeur. He was also appointed by Hitler as Chef des Kraftfahrwesens beim Führer und Reichskanzler (Chief of the Führer's and Reich Chancellor's Fleet of Cars).

As his chauffeur Kempka usually drove one of Hitler's black Mercedes cars from a fleet of six to eight that were stationed in Berlin, Munich and other places. Unless in the company of an important person, Hitler would sit in the front, next to Kempka, with a valet behind him. When travelling in motorcades, Hitler's car would be followed by two cars to the left and right, one with FBK men and the other with a detachment of Reichssicherheitsdienst (Reich Security Service; RSD) men. Further behind would be a car with his adjutants and physician, and more cars for press agency representatives, stenographers, and provisions. Later in July 1938, upon Kempka's directive a fully armor-plated Mercedes was built and delivered in time for Hitler's 50th birthday of 20 April 1939. The car had 18 mm steel plate and 40 mm bullet-proof glass.

On 1 December 1937, Kempka joined the Lebensborn society. He was awarded a Totenkopfring and the SS Honor Sword from Heinrich Himmler. At one time, Kempka had been engaged to Gerda Daranowski, a private secretary of Hitler's. She later married Luftwaffe officer Eckhard Christian on 2 February 1943.

Berlin 1945
In 1945, as the end of Nazi Germany drew near, Kempka accompanied Hitler to the Reich Chancellery and later the Führerbunker. By then, Kempka oversaw a fleet of 40 vehicles, 60 drivers and mechanics. On 20 April, ten days before Hitler's suicide, he briefly wished the Führer a happy birthday and spent about fifteen minutes with him.

Kempka was one of those responsible for the burning of Hitler and Eva Braun's corpses after they committed suicide together on the afternoon of 30 April 1945. Otto Günsche had telephoned Kempka and told him to obtain as much petrol as he could and bring it to the emergency exit of the Führerbunker. Kempka and his men brought over eight to ten army petrol cans, which contained an estimated 180 to 200 litres (about 50 U.S. gallons) of petrol and deposited them where they had been told to do so. The lifeless bodies of Hitler and Eva Braun were carried up the stairs and through the bunker's emergency exit to the garden behind the Reich Chancellery, where they were burned.  Later, SS guards brought over additional cans of petrol to further burn the corpses.

Kempka left the bunker complex on the following night of 1 May along with SS-Hauptscharführer Heinrich Doose, a driver who was part of his staff. His group went down through the underground railway tunnels and made it to Friedrichstrasse station. At around 2:00 am, another group approached, which included Martin Bormann and Ludwig Stumpfegger. The group followed a Tiger II tank which spearheaded the first attempt to storm across the Weidendammer Bridge, but it was destroyed. Bormann and Stumpfegger were "tossed into the air" when the tank was hit. Kempka was knocked down and knocked out. After he came to, Kempka came across the badly wounded SS-Obersturmbannführer Georg Betz  (Hitler's personal co-pilot and Hans Baur's substitute) and left him in the care of Kaethe Hausermann, a dental surgeon who had been on Hitler's staff working with Dr. Hugo Blaschke. Kempka went on to state that he learned that Betz died from his injuries a short time later.

Kempka and several others followed the rail tracks hoping to reach the Lehrter station. They came across some foreign workers hiding out in a shed where the Germans got rid of their uniforms and changed into civilian clothes. A group of Soviet soldiers discovered them. A Yugoslav girl who had given him civilian clothes told the Soviet soldiers that Kempka was her husband. The soldiers insisted the group join them and drink vodka in celebration of victory. Later the Soviet troops left the area. The Yugoslav girl led him through the Soviet checkpoints and on 30 May, Kempka made it to Wittenberg. In Munich, he obtained some new identification papers from a German girl who was employed by the Allies as an interpreter. He continued on from there to Berchtesgaden. On 20 June, Kempka was captured by U.S. troops at Berchtesgaden and held until 9 October 1947. He was the first witness the Americans captured who could confirm the death of Hitler.

Historical reliability
Despite claims made to the contrary during his interrogation, Kempka later admitted that when Hitler and Eva Braun locked themselves in a room of the Führerbunker to commit suicide, he was not nearby; he was present only after the event had occurred. By that time, Hitler and Braun's bodies had already been carried out of the study-office of the Führerbunker. There, Kempka took Braun's lifeless body from Martin Bormann and carried it halfway up the exit stairs before handing it over to Günsche, who carried it outside from the bunker exit and placed it on the ground of the Chancellery garden next to Hitler's corpse to be burned.

Kempka also admitted to interviewer, James P. O'Donnell that after his capture he told interrogators whatever they wanted to hear to save his neck. Despite his questionable reliability on certain points, many interviewers quote Kempka in their accounts of Hitler's suicide because of his colorful (and raunchy) language. For example, O'Donnell recounted the following quips in his book, The Bunker:

 He referred to SS General Hermann Fegelein as having "his brains in his scrotum" (Fegelein was executed by Hitler for trying to desert Berlin with his mistress).
 He remarked that when Magda Goebbels was around Hitler, you could "hear her ovaries rattling" (Magda Goebbels was said to be quite attached to Hitler psychologically).
 When Martin Bormann carried Eva Braun's corpse from the study-office in the bunker, Kempka took the body from him and insisted on carrying it himself, remarking that Bormann was carrying Braun "like a sack of potatoes" (Bormann and Braun had a mutual dislike).

Post-war period
He was released from captivity on 9 October 1947. Kempka died on 24 January 1975, aged sixty-four, in Freiberg am Neckar.

His memoirs first appeared in 1951 under the title Ich habe Adolf Hitler verbrannt (I cremated Adolf Hitler). In 1975, it was reissued with a foreword by author and former member of the Leibstandarte SS Adolf Hitler Erich Kern under the title Die letzten Tage mit Adolf Hitler (The Last Days with Adolf Hitler).  An English edition of the book was published in 2010 by Frontline Books-Skyhorse Publishing, Inc., under the title I was Hitler's Chauffeur: The Memoirs of Erich Kempka, with an introduction by historian Roger Moorhouse.

At the 2008 military trial for Osama bin-Laden's driver, Salim Hamdan, the defense argued for his innocence, noting that Kempka was not tried as a war criminal for being a chauffeur for Hitler.

See also

Glossary of Nazi Germany
List of Nazi Party leaders and officials
List of SS personnel
Downfall, 2004 film where he was portrayed by actor Jürgen Tonkel

Notes

References

Citations

Bibliography

External links
Memoir of Kempka 

1910 births
1975 deaths
People from Oberhausen
SS-Obersturmbannführer
People from the Rhine Province
German people of Polish descent
Chauffeurs of Adolf Hitler